The Illinois Southern Railway, a precursor to the Cairo and Vincennes Railroad, was chartered in Illinois on 6 May 1867. It is shown as Illinois Southern RR (and Rwy) on the 1861 and 1870 railroad maps of Illinois.

References

Defunct Missouri railroads
Defunct Illinois railroads